Mirage is the second studio album by the English progressive rock band Camel, released on 1 March 1974. It features songs such as "The White Rider", "Lady Fantasy", and "Supertwister" which includes a showcase for Andrew Latimer's flute.

There are five tracks on Mirage, two over 9 minutes. Those two are multi-part songs: "Lady Fantasy" and "Nimrodel/The Procession/The White Rider", the latter being about The Lord of the Rings. The album was released on Gama Records/Deram Records. Mick Rock shot the inner sleeve photo.

Critical reception

In an Sputnikmusic album review, critic Matthijs van der Lee declared Mirage as Camel's "magnum opus". The album was voted no. 51 in the Top 100 Prog albums of All Time by readers of Prog magazine in 2014.

Prog Sphere considered Mirage to be the band's best album, writing that it is a prog classic that should be owned by anyone that is a fan of progressive rock.

Release details
 1974, U.S., Janus Records
 1974, UK, Deram Records SML 1107, Release Date 1 March 1974, LP
 2002, UK, London 8829292, Release Date 3 June 2002, CD (remastered edition)

Track listing

Personnel
Camel
 Andrew Latimer – guitars, flute; vocals on "The White Rider" and "Lady Fantasy"
 Peter Bardens – organ, piano, Minimoog, Mellotron, Fender electric piano, Hohner clavinet, celesta; vocals on "Freefall" and "Lady Fantasy"
 Doug Ferguson – bass 
 Andy Ward – drums, percussion

Production
 Produced by David Hitchcock
 Engineered by Howard Kilgour and Bill Price

Charts

References

External links
 Official Site
 Camel - Mirage (1974) album review by Daevid Jehnzen, credits & releases at AllMusic.com
 Camel - Mirage (1974) album releases & credits at Discogs.com
 Camel - Mirage (1974) album to be listened as stream at Play.Spotify.com

1974 albums
Camel (band) albums
Deram Records albums
Albums produced by Dave Hitchcock
Albums with cover art by Mick Rock